Skithegga is a small river running out of lake Gjellum in Norway. It starts further up in Kjekstadmarka at the lake Heggsjøen and runs through Åsåker, Røyken, Buskerud county, and Hallenskog. The river normally has limited water, but during springtime it floods and put several farm areas under water.

Rivers of Viken
Rivers of Norway